Planodema flavovittata is a species of beetle in the family Cerambycidae. It was described by Stephan von Breuning in 1947.

Subspecies
 Planodema flavovittata latevittata Teocchi, 1994
 Planodema flavovittata flavovittata Breuning, 1947

References

Theocridini
Beetles described in 1947